The 1986–87 Roller Hockey Champions Cup was the 22nd edition of the Roller Hockey Champions Cup organized by CERH.

Liceo achieved their first title ever.

Teams
The champions of the main European leagues played this competition, consisting in a double-legged knockout tournament. As Portuguese champions Porto qualified as title holder, Benfica was also admitted as the Portuguese representative.

Bracket

Source:

References

External links
 CERH website

1986 in roller hockey
1987 in roller hockey
Rink Hockey Euroleague